is a Japanese commuter railway and keiretsu holding company in the Greater Tokyo Area as well as an intercity and regional operator in the Kantō region. Excluding the Japan Railways Group companies, Tobu's  rail system is the second longest in Japan after Kintetsu. It serves large portions of Saitama Prefecture, Gunma Prefecture and Tochigi Prefecture, as well as northern Tokyo and western Chiba Prefecture. The Tobu Railway Company is listed in the First Section of the Tokyo Stock Exchange and is a constituent of the Nikkei 225 index.

The Tobu corporate group is also engaged in road transportation (bus/taxi), real estate, and retail. It is the owner of the Tokyo Skytree, the tallest tower in the world. The company is a member of the Fuyo Group keiretsu.

The name "Tobu" is formed from the kanji for east (東) and Musashi (武蔵), the initial area served.

History
Tobu is one of the oldest railway companies in Japan. It was established in November 1897 and began operation between Kita-Senju and Kuki in August 1899. The Tojo Railway was founded in 1911 as a separate company, but shared its president and head office with Tobu.

In 1905, Nezu Kaichirō became the president of Tobu Railway and successfully helped to grow the company to one of the largest private rail operators in the Kanto region.

Tobu was the first railway in the Kanto region to adopt quadruple tracks, on the Kita-Senju to Takenotsuka sector in 1974. The Tobu Dobutsu Koen (Tobu Animal Park) opened in 1981.

Railway network

Tobu has two isolated networks which are connected by the Chichibu Railway for ferrying of its rolling stock.

It offers surcharged, seat-reserved limited express services from Tokyo to Nikkō and Kinugawa.

The Skytree and Isesaki Lines interoperate with the Tokyo Metro Hibiya Line, Tokyo Metro Hanzomon Line and the Tokyu Den-en-toshi Line to serve central,  southwestern Tokyo and Kanagawa Prefecture, while the Tojo Line interoperates with the Tokyo Metro Fukutoshin Line, Tokyo Metro Yurakucho Line, Tokyu Toyoko Line and Minatomirai Line to serve central and southwest Tokyo and Kanagawa Prefecture.

Main Lines

Tobu Tojo Lines

Rolling stock
, Tobu Railway operates a fleet of 1,890 electric multiple unit (EMU) vehicles, the third largest fleet for a private railway operator in Japan after Tokyo Metro (2,728 vehicles) and Kintetsu (1,905).

Express EMUs

 300/350 series EMU (introduced 1991, 300 series variant operated until 2017)
 200/250 series EMU Ryōmō (introduced 1991)
 100 series EMU Spacia (introduced 1990)
 634 series EMU Skytree Train (introduced 2012)
 500 series 3-car EMUs (introduced in April 2017)

Eight new three-car 500 series EMU trains were introduced on limited express services on lines from Asakusa in 21 April 2017.

Commuter EMUs
 8000 series EMU (introduced 1963)
 800/850 series EMU
 9000 series EMU (introduced 1981)
 10000 series EMU (introduced 1983)
 20000 series EMU (introduced 1988)
 30000 series EMU (introduced 1996)
 50000 series EMU (introduced 2005)
 60000 series EMU (introduced June 2013)
 70000 series EMU (since 7 July 2017)

Steam locomotive
Tobu plans to operate steam-hauled tourist services on the Kinugawa Line from 10 August 2017 using JNR Class C11 steam locomotive C11 207 loaned from JR Hokkaido together with JNR Class DE10 diesel locomotive DE10 1099 purchased from JR East, a fleet of six 12 and 14 series coaches purchased from JR Shikoku, and two Yo 8000 brake vans purchased from JR Freight and JR East.

Withdrawn types

Express EMUs
 1700/1720 series
 1800 series 
 5700 series
 6000 series
 6050 series

Commuter EMUs
 2000 series
 3000 series
 5000 series (1979–2006)
 7300 series
 7800 series

DMUs
 KiHa 2000 series

Steam locomotives
 Tobu B1 Class 4-4-0 (1898)

References

Further reading

External links

 Tobu Group website 

 
Railway companies of Japan
Companies listed on the Tokyo Stock Exchange
Transport companies based in Tokyo
Japanese companies established in 1897
Fuyo Group
Railway companies established in 1897